Double Bunk is a British black-and-white comedy film set on a houseboat. It was released in 1961, and stars Ian Carmichael and Sid James.

Plot

Facing eviction from their London flat, newlyweds Jack (Ian Carmichael) and Peggy (Janette Scott) are tricked into buying a rundown houseboat by its current owner Alfred Harper (Reginald Beckwith) and his put-upon wife (Irene Handl). Mr Watson (Dennis Price), who owns Jack and Peggy’s mooring, soon makes their acquaintance by introducing them to his mooring tariffs and associated surcharges.

Jack's used-car-salesman friend Sid (Sid James) helps him rebuild the engine, and the newlyweds take the boat down the River Thames to Ramsgate with Sid and his girlfriend Sandra (Liz Fraser) as passengers. On the way they have trouble with an official from the Thames Conservancy (Naunton Wayne) and a member of the river police (Terry Scott).

After Sandra's transistor radio gets misplaced next to the compass, they end up in Calais. With no fuel or supplies they must resort to desperate actions to get themselves and the houseboat back home. Sandra puts on a striptease for Watson, who also happens to be in Calais, so Jack and Sid can "borrow" some of Watson’s fuel and food. The next morning they follow Watson back across the Channel, as their own compass is broken, and enter into a wager with Watson on who can get back to their mooring first. They win the bet when Watson's boat runs aground.

Background
The houseboat, "Jasmine Cot", was actually "Joan Mary", an Admiralty 48-foot "Personnel Launch, Diesel" conversion. She was based at Newmans Shipyard, 1, Strawberry Vale, Twickenham.

Soundtrack
The musical score was composed by Stanley Black, and the title song, sung by Sid James and Liz Fraser, was by Stanley Black, Jack Fishman and Michael Pratt (later better known as the actor Mike Pratt).

Release
The film opened at the Leicester Square Theatre in London's West End on 30 March 1961 and went on general release in the UK on 8 May 1961.

The film went over budget by £4,500 and the producer had to write off personally £5,000.

Cast
 Ian Carmichael as Jack
 Janette Scott as Peggy
 Sid James as Sid
 Liz Fraser as Sandra 
 Dennis Price as Watson
 Reginald Beckwith as Harper
 Irene Handl as Mrs. Harper
 Noel Purcell as O'Malley 
 Naunton Wayne as 1st Thames Conservancy Officer
 Bill Shine as 2nd Thames Conservancy Officer
 Michael Shepley as Granville-Carter
 Toby Perkins as Pukka Type
 Miles Malleson as Rev. Thomas
 Jacques Cey as French Official
 Hedger Wallace as 1st River Policeman 
 Terry Scott as 2nd River Policeman
 Desmond Roberts as Freighter Captain 
 Peter Swanwick as Freighter Pilot
 Gerald Campion as Charlie 
 John Harvey as Johnnie 
 Graham Stark as Flowerman
 Gladys Henson as Madame de Sola 
 Willoughby Goddard as Prospective Purchaser 
 Marianne Stone as Prospective Purchaser's Wife
 Tom Gill as Customs Officer (uncredited)

Critical reception
The New York Times called it an "extremely anemic little British comedy."
The Spinning Image called it "a gently amusing feel-good comedy that chugs along nicely. ... You know you're in for a good time as soon as Double Bunk'''s opening credits kick in accompanied by a jaunty ditty sung by co-stars Sid James and Liz Fraser" Britmovie'' wrote, "the supporting cast is a veritable treasure trove of familiar faces, including Sid James, Naunton Wayne, Liz Fraser, Irene Handl, Miles Malleson and Noel Purcell and Dennis Price."

References

External links 

Available on DVD by Odeon Entertainment

1961 films
British black-and-white films
1961 comedy films
British comedy films
Films directed by C. M. Pennington-Richards
1960s English-language films
1960s British films